Rochelle Rao (born 25 November 1988) is an Indian model and actress. She was crowned Miss India International in 2012. She was a contestant on the reality shows Jhalak Dikhhla Jaa 6, Fear Factor: Khatron Ke Khiladi 5, Bigg Boss 9 and Nach Baliye 9. She also appeared as a main character in The Kapil Sharma Show.

Early life 
Rochelle Rao was born in Chennai on 25 November 1988. Her father, Nicolas V Rao, of Telugu-German ancestry is a naturalist while her mother, Wendy Rao, is an Anglo-Indian. Her sister Paloma Rao is also an actress.

She holds a BSc in electronic media from MOP Vaishnav College for Women, Chennai.

Femina Miss India 
Rochelle Rao competed in the fifth Pantaloons Femina Miss India South pageant in January 2012 where she was first runner up. She lost the title to Shamata Anchan. She later participated at Femina Miss India and emerged as the Femina Miss India International 2012 winner. She has also won three subtitles. "Miss Glamorous Diva", "Miss Ramp Walk", "Miss Body Beautiful". She represented India at Miss International 2012 pageant held in October 2012 (Okinawa, Japan) where she ranked ninth out of 68 countries.

Career 
She won the Femina Miss India International 2012 crown. Prior to this she was a model and anchor in Chennai. Rochelle was crowned by the outgoing titleholder Ankita Shorey.

She later turned host for season six of the Indian Premier League. Currently living in Mumbai, she has anchored various events and TV shows. She has also featured in many men's magazines.

She was featured in the February 2014 page of the Kingfisher calendar.

In August 2013, Rochelle was seen in Jhalak Dikhhla Jaa season 6 which aired on Colors as a wild card entrant. She did not get chosen for the show as she did her performance.

She was also seen in season 5 of the show Fear Factor: Khatron Ke Khiladi in 2014. She was the second contestant to be eliminated from the show that was hosted by Rohit Shetty. In late 2014 she was seen on an adventurous travel show on Fox Life called Life Mein Ek Baar along with Evelyn Sharma, Pia Trivedi and Mahek Chahal.

In 2015, Rao became a contestant on the Indian reality TV series, Bigg Boss 9 along with boyfriend Keith Sequeira. She was paired with Prince Narula but later changed with Rimi Sen.

Rochelle Rao also hosted Aug 2022 India's Laughter Champion show successfully. 

Rao is currently playing various roles in the comedy show The Kapil Sharma Show on Sony TV which started in April 2016.

She was last seen in 1962: The War in the Hills as Rimpa.

Filmography

Television 

Web Series

References

External links

 Rochelle Rao at IMDb
 

1988 births
Living people
Actresses from Chennai
Female models from Chennai
Female models from Tamil Nadu
Bigg Boss (Hindi TV series) contestants
Fear Factor: Khatron Ke Khiladi participants
Femina Miss India winners
Miss International 2012 delegates
Indian people of German descent
Beauty pageant contestants from India
Telugu people
Anglo-Indian people
Actresses of European descent in Indian films